Dominic Clarke (born 4 January 1997) is an Australian trampoline gymnast who represented his country at the 2020 Summer Olympics.

Clarke first competed at the Trampoline Gymnastics World Championships in 2015, placing fourth in both the synchronised and double mini trampoline events. At the 2017 championships, he won the bronze medal in the double mini event. At the 2018 championships, he won the bronze medal in the synchronised event. 

In July 2021, Clarke secured selection for the delayed 2020 Summer Olympics, held in Tokyo. He qualified for the final coming fourth in the qualification. He did not win a medal.

Clarke started training in gymnastics at the age of five in the Redlands, located in the Brisbane metropolitan area.

In 2022, Clarke auditioned for The Voice Australia where he ultimately chose to be on Team Rita. He was eliminated the next round.

Personal life
Clarke was born in Plymouth, Devon, England, before moving to Australia as a child. He identifies as gay and queer, and is the pride ambassador for Gymnastics New South Wales he has taught at a public school in New South wales.

References

External links
 Dominic Clarke at the Australian Olympic Committee
 Dominic Clarke at the New South Wales Institute of Sport

1997 births
Living people
Australian male trampolinists
Gymnasts at the 2020 Summer Olympics
Medalists at the Trampoline Gymnastics World Championships
Olympic gymnasts of Australia
Australian LGBT sportspeople
Gay sportsmen
Queer men
Sportspeople from Plymouth, Devon
English emigrants to Australia
LGBT gymnasts
21st-century LGBT people
21st-century Australian people